James S. "Jim" McAleney (born August 15, 1969 in Fort St. John, British Columbia) is a Canadian Thoroughbred horse racing jockey.

A native of Fort St. John, British Columbia, Jim McAleney began his career as a jockey in Western Canada where in 1986 at Northlands Park in Edmonton, Alberta he got his first win. The following year, he competed in the West as well as in Ontario. For the year he finished sixth in wins among all jockeys in North America, a performance that earned him the Sovereign Award for Outstanding Apprentice Jockey.

Based in Toronto in 1988, he raced at Greenwood Raceway and at Woodbine Racetrack and repeated as Champion apprentice that year.

Consistently among the top jockeys in Ontario, Jim McAleney has also won races Monmouth Park and Keeneland Race Course and other tracks in the United States. In 2001, he won his first Canadian Classic Race when he rode Sweetest Thing to victory in the Breeders' Stakes.

In 2004, McAleney returned to Northlands Park to compete in the Canadian Derby, winning the race aboard Organ Grinder. In 2007, he broke his leg two days before the start of the season and was out until August 15. On his return, he won Woodbine Racetrack's Victoriana Stakes for a record fifth time.

As at August 6, 2008 McAleney is the leading jockey at Woodbine Racetrack.

References
 James McAleney at The Jockeys Guild

Year-end charts 

1969 births
Canadian jockeys
People from Fort St. John, British Columbia
Sovereign Award winners
Living people